The Roman Catholic Archdiocese of Port Moresby is a Latin Metropolitan Archdiocese in Papua New Guinea, yet remains dependent on the missionary Propaganda Fide Roman Congregation.

Its archiepiscopal seat is St. Mary's Cathedral, in Port Moresby, National Capital District.

History 
 Established on 10 May 1889 as Apostolic Vicariate of New Guinea on territory split off from the then Apostolic Vicariate of Melanesia.
 Renamed on 1922.11.14 as Apostolic Vicariate of Papua
 Renamed on 1946.06.13 as Apostolic Vicariate of Port Moresby, having lost territory to establish the Apostolic Prefecture of Samarai (now suffragan diocese Alotau-Sideia)
 Lost territory on 1958.11.13 to establish the Apostolic Prefecture of Mendi
 Lost territories on 1959.07.16 to establish the Apostolic Vicariate of Yule Island and the Apostolic Prefecture of Daru (now suffragan Diocese of Daru-Kiunga)
 Promoted on 1966.11.15 as Metropolitan Archdiocese of Port Moresby
 It enjoyed papal visits from Pope John Paul II in May 1984.05 and January 1995.

Bishops

Ordinaries
(all Roman Rite, so far missionary members of Latin congregations)

Apostolic Vicars of New Guinea
 Louis-André Navarre, Sacred Heart Missionaries (M.S.C.) (1889.05.10 – 1908.01), Titular Bishop of Pentacomia (1887.05.17 – 1888.08.17) ; died 1912.01.16
 Alain-Marie Guynot de Boismenu, M.S.C. (1908.01 – 1922.11.14 see below), Titular Bishop of Gabala (1899.05.23 – 1945.01.18), succeeded as former Coadjutor Apostolic Vicar of New Guinea (1899.05.23 – 1908.01)

Apostolic Vicar Papua
 Alain Guynot de Boismenu, M.S.C. (see above 1922.11.14 – retired 1946), later Titular Archbishop of Claudiopolis in Honoriade (1945.01.18 – death 1953.11.05)

Apostolic Vicars Port Moresby
 André Sorin, M.S.C. (1946.06.13 – death 1959.04.19), Titular Bishop of Antiphræ (1946.06.13 – 1959.04.19); previously Apostolic Administrator of Samarai (Papua New Guinea) (1946.06.13 – 1951.05.18)
Apostolic Administrator Virgil Patrick Copas, M.S.C. (1959.12.19 – 1966.11.15 see below), Titular Bishop of Bennefa (1959.12.19 – 1966.11.15)

Metropolitan Archbishops of Port Moresby
 Virgil Patrick Copas, M.S.C. (see above 1966.11.15 – retired 1975.12.19), also Apostolic Administrator of suffragan see Bereina (Papua New Guinea) (1973 – 1976.03.01); later Archbishop-Bishop of Kerema (Papua New Guinea) (1976.05.24 – retired 1988.12.06); died 1993.10.03
 Herman To Paivu (1975.12.19 – death 1981.02.12), former Titular Bishop of Temuniana (1974.07.01 – 1975.12.19) & Auxiliary Bishop of Port Moresby (1974.07.01 – 1975.12.19)
 Peter Kurongku (1981.10.03 – death 1996.06.11); previously Titular Bishop of Sinnuara (1978.11.15 – 1981.10.03) & Auxiliary Bishop of Honiara (Solomon Islands) (1978.11.15 – 1981.10.03)
 Brian James Barnes, Friars Minor (O.F.M.) (14 June 1997 – 26 March 2008), previously Bishop of Aitape (Papua New Guinea) (1987.10.03 – 1997.06.14), President of Bishops’ Conference of Papua New Guinea and Solomon Islands (1993 – 1994); died 2017.05.09
 Sir John Ribat, KBE, M.S.C. (26 March 2008 - ...), also Cardinal (19 November 2016 - ...), President of Bishops’ Conference of Papua New Guinea and Solomon Islands (2011.05 – 2014.05), President of Federation of Catholic Bishops’ Conferences of Oceania (2014.05 – ...); previously Titular Bishop of Macriana minor (2000.10.30 – 2002.02.12) & Auxiliary Bishop of Bereina (Papua New Guinea) (2000.10.30 – 2002.02.12), succeeded as Bishop of Bereina (2002.02.12 – 2007.04.16), then Coadjutor Archbishop of Port Moresby (Papua New Guinea) (2007.04.16 – 2008.03.26)

Coadjutor bishops
Stanislas Henri Verjus, M.S.C. (1889-1892), as Coadjutor Vicar Apostolic; did not succeed to see
Alain Guynot de Boismenu, M.S.C. (1899-1908), as Coadjutor Vicar Apostolic
John Ribat, M.S.C. (2007-2008); future Cardinal

Auxiliary bishops
Louis Vangeke, M.S.C. (1970-1976), appointed Bishop of Bereina
Herman To Paivu (1974-1975), appointed Archbishop here
Cherubim Alfred Dambui (2000-2010)

Province 
Its ecclesiastical province comprises the Metropolitan's own archdiocese and the following suffragan dioceses : 
 Roman Catholic Diocese of Alotau-Sideia
 Roman Catholic Diocese of Bereina
 Roman Catholic Diocese of Daru-Kiunga 
 Roman Catholic Diocese of Kerema.

References

Sources and external links
 GCatholic with incumbent biography links

Roman Catholic Ecclesiastical Province of Port Moresby